Vexillology is the study of the history, symbolism and usage of flags or, by extension, any interest in flags in general. The word is a synthesis of the Latin word  (which refers to a kind of square flag which was carried by Roman cavalry) and the Greek suffix  ("study"). The first known usage of the word vexillology was in 1959.

A person who studies flags is a vexillologist, one who designs flags is a vexillographer, and the art of designing flags is called vexillography. One who is a hobbyist or general admirer of flags is a vexillophile.

History

The study of flags, or vexillology, was formalized by the U.S. scholar and student of flags Whitney Smith in 1961 with the publication of The Flag Bulletin. During his lifetime, Smith organized various flag organizations and meetings including the first International Congress of Vexillology (ICV), the North American Vexillological Association, and the International Federation of Vexillological Associations (FIAV). Smith, who is acknowledged as conceiving the term "vexillology" in 1957, wrote "[w]hile the use of flags goes back to the earliest days of human civilization, the study of that usage in a serious fashion is so recent that the term for it did not appear in print until 1959." Before this time, the study of flags was generally considered a part of heraldry, the study of armorial bearings.

Involvement in vexillology includes academic work in fields such as sociology, history or design, professional or otherwise, contributions from the flag industry, and interest from those simply passionate about flags. ICV and local vexillological meetings often cover a wide range of interest in flags. Since 1969, an International Congress of Vexillology meeting has been organized every two years under the auspices of FIAV; papers presented at an ICV are published afterwards as the Congress's Proceedings.

In more modern times, involvement in vexillology has become less popular but is more accessible due to many internet forums and communities, one of the most notable examples being r/vexillology, a community on Reddit dedicated to the subject, which has popularised vexillology to younger generations. The constant reiteration of the flag as a symbol of a something that exists by the entity that it symbolises confirms the validity of the flag as an officially sanctioned and/or definitive symbol of an entity; therefore, there has been a close association between vexillology/vexillogic imagination in creating visual symbols that appear to legitimise micronational claims.

Vexillological organizations
Vexillological organizations consist of the International Federation of Vexillological Associations (FIAV) which is considered an International Body of Vexilology. FIAV has more regional Associates and other Centers of Flags, such as North American Vexillological Association (NAVA),  (translated to English as 'German Society for Flag Studies'), Flag Heritage Foundation (FHF), The Flag Research Center (FRC), Flags of the World (FOTW), and 46 other affiliated associations and institutes with the International Federation of Vexillological Associations.

See also

 Flags of the World
 Glossary of vexillology
 List of flags by design
 List of national flags by design
 Vexilloid
 Vexillological symbol

References

Further reading
 Leepson, Marc. Flag: An American Biography. New York: Thomas Dunne Books, 2005. 
 Marshall, Tim. A Flag Worth Dying For: The Power and Politics of Flag. 2016.

External links

  of the International Federation of Vexillological Associations

Vexillology